Kudaru is a town in Lere Local Government Area in southern Kaduna state in the Middle Belt region of Nigeria. The postal code of the area is 811.

Geography
The Kudaru ring complex was discovered to contain mildly alkaline fayalite granite porphyry, peralkaline arfvedsonite granite and metaluminous biotite granite, emplaced between 176.9 ± 2.5 and 180.55 ± 0.6 Ma. These rocks, typical of A-type granites "are characterized by variably high alkalis, HFSEs, Ga/Al ratios, and zircon saturation temperature".

References

Populated places in Kaduna State